James Harkness may refer to:

 James Harkness (mathematician) (1864–1923), Canadian mathematician
 James Harkness (minister) (born 1935), Church of Scotland minister
 James Harkness (actor), Scottish actor